The Ramsey Mill was built by Alexander Ramsey and Dr. Thomas Foster in 1856–1857 on the Vermillion River in the town of Hastings in the U.S. state of Minnesota. An addition included a cooper shop and storage facility. Although Ramsey sold his interest in 1877, it retained his name. Maximum output was achieved in 1894, at 125 barrels per day. On December 22, 1894, the building burned, possibly due to arson.

Gallery

References

Buildings and structures in Hastings, Minnesota
Industrial buildings completed in 1857
Parks on the National Register of Historic Places in Minnesota
Ruins in the United States
National Register of Historic Places in Dakota County, Minnesota
1857 establishments in Minnesota Territory
Watermills in the United States
Grinding mills on the National Register of Historic Places in Minnesota